Aleksandr Pavlov may refer to:
 Aleksandr Pavlov (wrestler) (born 1973), Belarusian wrestler
 Aleksandr Pavlov (politician), Kazakhstani politician, deputy leader in Nur Otan
 Aleksandr Pavlov (speedway rider), Soviet speedway racer
 Alexander Pavlov (figure skater) (born 1977), Australian figure skater
 Alyaksandr Pawlaw (born 1984), Belarusian international footballer